The Cartoon d'Or was a European award for animated short films.

History
It was rewarded every year to the best European short film from Cartoon's partner festivals until it was suppressed in favor of the Emile Awards.
Amongst this short list, a jury selects 5 films that will be screened during the Cartoon Forum (in order to promote 5 filmmakers each year) and one film will receive the Cartoon d'Or.

Created in 1991, the Cartoon d'Or used to be the only completely European animation prize until the final award was given to Gabriel Harel for Yùl and the Snake in 2016. The competition aimed to "promote the talents of European animation."

Background
The Cartoon d'Or was created in order to nourish the European animation industry by work from creative filmmakers. European television series lacked of creativity to compete with programming on offer from the United States and Japan.

Moreover, although major financial support was being given to develop European animation, no special place was made for it at major European festivals and awards (Cannes Film Festival, Berlin, Venice, the European Felix etc.).

The award ceremony
The award ceremony takes place during the Cartoon Forum which gathers all the players in the economic structure of European animation (700 professionals including 250 potential investors, 350 producers, 60 journalists and 40 public funding bodies). Consequently, the Cartoon Forum can act as a pipeline between short film makers and the industry. Indeed, the finalists are often approached by producers to work on series or feature films. Some finalists and prize-winners have themselves gone on to make series or feature films.

List of winners

See also
 Academy Award for Best Animated Short Film
 List of animation awards

References

External links
Official Cartoon website, Cartoon d'Or

1991 establishments in Europe
Animation awards
Awards disestablished in 2016
Awards established in 1991
Short film awards